Lithuanians in Sweden are people of full or partial Lithuanian descent residing in Sweden. 

Besides occasional persons, many Lithuanians moved to Sweden after the defeated Uprising of 1863 against the Russian Empire. Next two waves were associated with the World Wars. During the interwar, a number of Lithuanians studied in Swedish universities and during 1925-1940 there was the Swedish-Lithuanian Society (reestablished in 1990).

During World War II about 400 Lithuanian refugees fled to Sweden. By 1960s most of them moved to other countries, mostly to the United States and Canada, an in 1963 there were about 100 Lithuanians left. 

After Lithuania reestablished its independence from the Soviet Union, Lithuanians started moving to Sweden for work and study. This process intensified after Lithuania joined the European Union, and in 2017, according to the official data, there were 13,659 Lithuania-born residents in Sweden.

See also 

 Latvians in Sweden

References

External links
Lietuvių bendruomenė Švedijoje "Lithuanian community in Sweden"; (English-language version) 

 
Ethnic groups in Sweden
Lithuania–Sweden relations